Torpoint Athletic Football Club is a football club based in Torpoint, Cornwall, England.

History
The club was formed as a merger of Torpoint Triumph and Torpoint Defiance. They won the Cornwall Senior Cup, the Cornwall Charity Cup and the Plymouth & District League in 1905–06, and retained the Senior Cup the following season, before winning it again in 1908–09 and 1909–10. After World War I the club won the Senior Cup in 1919–20, 1921–22, 1922–23, 1928–29 and 1932–33.

In 1962 Torpoint joined the South Western League, going on to win the league title in 1964–65 and 1966–67. They were runners-up in the league in 1995–96, a season which also saw them win the Cornwall Senior Cup for the first time since the 1930s. In 2003–04 the club won the League Cup.

In 2007 the South Western League merged with the Devon County League to form the South West Peninsula League, with Torpoint placed in the Premier Division. Following league reorganisation at the end of the 2018–19 season, the club were moved to the Premier Division East.

In the 2021/22 season Torpoint Athletic became South West Peninsula Premier Division East Champions, the first time the 1st team have won a league championship for 55 years, the last time was in 1967 with Les Cardew as manager, his grandson Dean Cardew is the manager today. In this season’s cup competitions they got to the FA Vase 2nd Round Proper, competed in the Cornwall Senior Cup and won the  Walter C Parson Cup Final, beating St Blazey 3-1 at Pennygillam, completing a League & League Cup double. They lost the SWPL Champions Bowl 4-2 to Falmouth Town (SWPL West Champions) at Bodmin Town.

Honours
South West Peninsula Premier Division East
Champions: 2021-22
Walter C Parson SWPL League Cup
Winners: 2021-22
South West Peninsula Champions Bowl
Runners-up: 2022
South Western League
Champions: 1964–65, 1966–67
Plymouth & District League
Champions: 1905–06
Cornwall Senior Cup
Winners: 1905–06, 1906–07, 1908–09, 1909–10, 1919–20, 1921–22, 1922–23, 1928–29, 1932–33, 1995–96
Cornwall Charity Cup
Winners: 1905–06, 1909–10, 1910–11, 1920–21, 1936–37, 1967–68, 1968–69, 1995–96

Records
Best FA Cup performance: First qualifying round, 2010–11 & 2022/23
Best FA Vase performance: Quarter-finals, 2010–11

References

External links

Official website

Football clubs in Cornwall
Football clubs in England
1887 establishments in England
Association football clubs established in 1887
South Western Football League
South West Peninsula League